Le Malesherbois is a commune in the Loiret department of north-central France. The municipality was established on 1 January 2016 by merger of the former communes of Malesherbes, Coudray, Labrosse, Mainvilliers, Manchecourt, Nangeville and Orveau-Bellesauve.

Population

See also 
Communes of the Loiret department

References 

Communes of Loiret